Román Junior Méndez Pérez (born July 25, 1990) is a Dominican professional baseball pitcher for the Bravos de León of the Mexican League. He has played in Major League Baseball (MLB) for the Texas Rangers and Boston Red Sox, and in Nippon Professional Baseball (NPB) for the Hanshin Tigers.

Professional career

Boston Red Sox
On July 16, 2007, Méndez signed with the Boston Red Sox as an international free agent. Méndez made his professional debut with the DSL Red Sox in 2008. He spent the 2009 season with the rookie ball GCL Red Sox, registering a 2-3 record and 1.99 ERA with 47 strikeouts in 12 games. Méndez was assigned to the Single-A Greenville Drive to begin the 2010 season, but was later demoted to the Low-A Lowell Spinners after recording an 11.40 ERA in 6 appearances.

Texas Rangers
On July 31, 2010, Méndez was traded, along with Chris McGuiness, to the Texas Rangers in exchange for Jarrod Saltalamacchia. He finished the season in Low-A with the Spokane Indians. In 2011, Méndez spent the season in Single-A with the Hickory Crawdads, registering a 9-1 record and 3.31 ERA in 26 games.

Méndez was added to the Rangers' 40-man roster on November 21, 2011. He split the 2012 season between three Rangers affiliates, the Double-A Frisco RoughRiders, the High-A Myrtle Beach Pelicans, and the rookie ball AZL Rangers on a three game rehab assignment, accumulating a 6-7 record and 4.43 ERA between the clubs. Méndez did not make a major league appearance in 2013 as well, spending the season in Frisco, pitching to a 1.82 ERA with 24 strikeouts in 16 games. He was assigned to the Triple-A Round Rock Express to begin the 2014 season.

The Rangers promoted Méndez to the major leagues on July 8, 2014, and he made his MLB debut that day, pitching 2.0 scoreless innings against the Houston Astros. Méndez made 30 appearances for the Rangers in 2014, registering a 2.18 ERA with 22 strikeouts. Méndez began the 2015 season with Texas, but was optioned to Round Rock after pitching to a 5.40 ERA in 12 appearances. He was designated for assignment by the Rangers on September 1, 2015.

Boston Red Sox (second stint)
On September 11, 2015, Méndez was claimed off waivers by the Boston Red Sox. In 3 late season games for the Red Sox, Méndez allowed 1 run in 2.0 innings of work. On December 2, 2015, Méndez was designated for assignment by the Red Sox. Méndez spent the 2016 season in Triple-A with the Pawtucket Red Sox, and pitched to a 4-2 record and 3.38 ERA with 59 strikeouts without receiving a call-up to the big league club. On November 7, 2016, he elected free agency.

Hanshin Tigers
On November 30, 2016, Méndez signed with the Hanshin Tigers of Nippon Professional Baseball (NPB) for the 2017 season. In 8 games for Hanshin, he struggled to a 6.52 ERA and became a free agent after the season.

Washington Nationals
On January 3, 2018, Méndez signed a minor league contract with the Washington Nationals. Méndez spent the year in Double-A with the Harrisburg Senators and elected free agency on November 2, 2018.

Tecolotes de los Dos Laredos
On April 3, 2019, Méndez signed with the Tecolotes de los Dos Laredos of the Mexican League. Méndez did not play in a game in 2020 due to the cancellation of the LMB season because of the COVID-19 pandemic. He later became a free agent.

Saraperos de Saltillo
On April 23, 2022, Méndez signed with the Saraperos de Saltillo of the Mexican League. Mèndez appeared in 38 games for Saltillo, working to a 4-0 record and 5.01 ERA with 33 strikeouts in 41.1 innings pitched. He was released on July 25.

Bravos de León
On February 13, 2023, Méndez signed with the Bravos de León of the Mexican League.

References

External links

1990 births
Living people
Arizona League Rangers players
Boston Red Sox players
Dominican Republic expatriate baseball players in Japan
Dominican Republic expatriate baseball players in Mexico
Dominican Republic expatriate baseball players in the United States
Dominican Summer League Red Sox players
Frisco RoughRiders players
Greenville Drive players
Gulf Coast Red Sox players
Hanshin Tigers players
Hickory Crawdads players

Lowell Spinners players
Major League Baseball pitchers
Major League Baseball players from the Dominican Republic
Myrtle Beach Pelicans players
Nippon Professional Baseball pitchers
Round Rock Express players
Saraperos de Saltillo players
Spokane Indians players
Tecolotes de los Dos Laredos players
Texas Rangers players
Toros del Este players
Harrisburg Senators players
Estrellas Orientales players